İpar Özay Kurt (born 10 November 2003) is a Turkish volleyball player. She plays for Fenerbahçe as wing spiker with jersey number 16.

İpar Özay Kurt was born in Istanbul, Turkey on 10 November 2003.

Club
After playing for the İlbank in Ankara, she joined the Istanbul-based club Fenerbahçe in 2017. Between 2015 and 2017, she enjoyed several local and national champion titles.

International

Girls' U15/U16
Kurt was part of the girls' national youth team, which finished the U16 Balkan Championship held in Sofia, Bulgaria in 2017 at fourth place,

Girls' U17/U18
She won the bronze medal with the national U17/U18 team the 2018 Girls' U17 European Championship in Sofia, Bulgaria. She was a member of the bronze-medalist women's national U18 team at the 2019 European Youth Summer Olympic Festival held in Baku, Azerbaijan. Kurt played for the national team at the 2019 FIVB  Girls' U18 World Championship in Cairo, Egypt, which ranked 9th. As of 2020, she was 22 times part of the Turkish national youth and junior teams.

Women's U19/U20
She was named the "Most valuable player" of the 2020 Women's U19 European Championship in Zenica, Bosnia and Herzogovina, where the Turkey national U20 team became champion.

Honours

Individual
 Most Valuable Player 2020 Women's U19 Volleyball European Championship

International
 2018 Girls' U17 Volleyball European Championship - Third place
 2019 European Youth Summer Olympic Festival- Third place
 2020 Women's U19 Volleyball European Championship - Champion

References

Living people
2003 births
Volleyball players from Istanbul
Turkish women's volleyball players
Outside hitters
İller Bankası volleyballers
Fenerbahçe volleyballers
21st-century Turkish women